Maximilien Winter (1871–1935) was a French philosopher of mathematics.

In 1893 Winter helped Xavier Léon to found the Revue de métaphysique et de morale. After the First World War Winter ran the Supplément of the Revue until his death in 1935.

Works
La méthode dans la philosophie des mathématiques [Method in the philosophy of mathematics], Paris: F. Alcan, 1911

References

External links
 

Year of birth unknown
1935 deaths
Philosophers of mathematics
French philosophers
1871 births
French male writers